The Malaysia national rugby union team has not played at the Rugby World Cup, but has attempted to qualify since the South African World Cup in 1995.

History

Malaysian Rugby Union (Kesatuan Ragbi Malaysia) is the representative of Malaysian rugby. They have good competition with their neighbours Singapore, and the Singapore-Malaysia were well contested and well viewed matched. But funding for the sport has not been very generous.

Malaysian rugby is also very promising with many new players embracing the sport. In 2013, rookies Razman Arsad were brought to the team and becoming the top scorer, scoring 69 tries in his first season. Meanwhile, Nureikmar Muhamad has also made a large impact which led to him becoming the vice captain of the team. The new coach has led the team to many victories that includes over the Philippines. The most important thing however is the youth as, young starlets like Abdul Izzudin, David Liong, Eugene Ong, John Ng and Terrence Loh has cultivated the country to go in the right direction.

Current Results

2016 Asia Rugby Championship - Division 1

Tournament was held at Royal Selangor Stadium, Kuala Lumpur, Malaysia.
Malaysia 10-15	 Philippines (L)
Malaysia 42–17	 Sri Lanka (W)
Malaysia 40–20	 Singapore (W)
Malaysia won the tournament but will remain in Division 1 in the next edition after they decided not to challenge for promotion (Top 3 Challenge) from third placers of the main tournament.

Squad
2022 Asian Rugby Championships

Competitive record

Asia Rugby Championship

ARFU Asian Rugby Championship

Asian Five Nations division tournaments

Asia Rugby Championship division tournaments

**Red border colour indicates tournament was held on home soil.
Since 2015, format of the competition was changed.

See also
 1995 Rugby World Cup - Asia qualification
 1999 Rugby World Cup - Asia qualification
 2003 Rugby World Cup - Asia qualification
 2007 Rugby World Cup - Asia qualification
 2011 Rugby World Cup - Asia qualification
 2015 Rugby World Cup - Asia qualification

References

External links
 Malaysia RugbyData.com
 Malaysia malaysiarugby.com

 
Asian national rugby union teams
Rugby union in Malaysia